Mirza Mousa Mosque is a prominent old mosque in Tehran, Iran, located in Naser Khosrou Street in Tehran Grand Bazaar.

History
The mosque was built in 1277 Hijri Qamari in Qajar era. It is registered as a national heritage site by the National Cultural Heritage Org of Iran (ID No 11198). The mosque has been used as seminary school since the time of kingship of Nasereddin Shah.

References

Shia mosques in Iran